The 2021–22 UC San Diego Tritons men's basketball team represented the University of California, San Diego in the 2021–22 NCAA Division I men's basketball season. The Tritons, led by ninth-year head coach Eric Olen, played their games at the RIMAC Arena as members of the Big West Conference.  

The Tritons were ineligible for postseason tournaments, including the NCAA tournament and Big West tournament, as they were in the second year of the a four-year mandatory transition period to Division I. Their conference games did not count on the records of UCSD or any other member of the Big West.

Previous season 
In a season limited due to the ongoing COVID-19 pandemic, the Tritons finished the 2020–21 season 7–10, 4–8 in Big West play, although their Big West games were not counted in the conference standings. They were ineligible for the NCAA tournament and Big West tournament as they were in the first year of their transition period from the California Collegiate Athletic Association in Division II.

Roster

Schedule and results 

|-
!colspan=12 style=| Exhibition

|-
!colspan=9 style=| Non-conference regular season

|-
!colspan=12 style=| Big West regular season

|-

Source:

References 

2021–22 Big West Conference men's basketball season
2021–22
2021 in sports in California
2022 in sports in California